Paul Ronald Lambers (June 25, 1942 – December 1, 1970) was a United States Army soldier and a recipient of the United States military's highest decoration—the Medal of Honor—for his actions in the Vietnam War.

Biography 
Lambers joined the Army from his birth city of Holland, Michigan in 1965, and by August 20, 1968, was serving as a Sergeant in Company A, 2nd Battalion, 27th Infantry Regiment, 25th Infantry Division. During a firefight on that day, in Tây Ninh Province, Republic of Vietnam, Lambers took command after the platoon leader was wounded. For his conspicuous leadership during the battle he was promoted to Staff Sergeant and awarded the Medal of Honor in December 1969.

Walking along Lake Michigan two years later in inclement weather, he was swept off a breakwater and drowned at age 28. His body was never recovered.

Medal of Honor citation 
Staff Sergeant Lambers' official Medal of Honor citation reads:

See also 
 List of Medal of Honor recipients for the Vietnam War

Notes 

1942 births
1970 deaths
United States Army personnel of the Vietnam War
United States Army Medal of Honor recipients
Deaths by drowning in the United States
People from Holland, Michigan
Military personnel from Michigan
United States Army soldiers
Vietnam War recipients of the Medal of Honor